Malavan (also Romanized as Malavān and Malvān) is a village in Aliabad Rural District, Khafr District, Jahrom County, Fars Province, Iran. At the 2006 census, its population was 174, in 49 families.

References 

Populated places in  Jahrom County